Fired (Swedish: Uppsagd) is a 1934 Swedish drama film directed by Ivar Johansson and starring Sture Lagerwall, Anne-Marie Brunius and Mathias Taube. It was shot at the Råsunda Studios in Stockholm. The film's sets were designed by the art director Arne Åkermark.

Synopsis
An office clerk loses his job when his company acquires a new machine that can do his work much faster than he can.

Cast
 Sture Lagerwall as 	Björn Kraft
 Anne-Marie Brunius as 	Maud Hage
 Mathias Taube as 	Hage
 Georg Rydeberg as 	Bugge
 Eva Turitz as 	Eva
 Anna Olin as 	Mrs. Lundbom
 Nils Lundell as 	Anders Gottfrid Karlsson
 Thor Modéen as 	The supervisor
 Margit Andelius as 	Secretary 
 Wiktor Andersson as Hen-pecked husband 
 Gunnar Björnstrand as 	Kirre Skoglund 
 Tor Borong as 	Office Director 
 Eivor Engelbrektsson as 	Maid Elin 
 Knut Frankman as 	Svensson 
 Olle Hilding as 	Aron Jacobsky 
 Lilly Kjellström as Amalia 
 Gösta Lycke as 	Insurance Director 
 John Melin as 	Administrator 
 Yngve Nyqvist as 	Office Director 
 Charley Paterson as 	Office Supplies Director

References

Bibliography 
 Qvist, Per Olov & von Bagh, Peter. Guide to the Cinema of Sweden and Finland. Greenwood Publishing Group, 2000.

External links 
 

1934 films
Swedish drama films
1934 drama films
1930s Swedish-language films
Films directed by Ivar Johansson
Swedish black-and-white films
1930s Swedish films